You're Next is a 2010 thriller novel written by Gregg Hurwitz. It was his 11th novel.

Plot 
The book centres around the character Mike Wingate - a property developer. He has been raised in foster care after being abandoned by his father at four. He presently has a wife and an 8-year-old daughter, has his construction company which is about to finish a green housing development project and be honoured by the Governor for environmental building practices. But things go quickly wrong when he meets a crippled stranger at a party. Things quickly escalate from him receiving threats to attacks - one of which nearly kills his wife. When he reports them to the police, they seem more interested in Mike's past than in protecting him.

With his family in mortal danger Mike turns to Shep - a dangerous man. He knows Shep from his days in foster care and he is the only friend Mike has. Together they try and protect Mike's family from the hidden men and uncover why suddenly both these hidden strangers and the police are after him.

References

American thriller novels
2010 American novels
Books by Gregg Hurwitz
Sphere Books books